The 2009–10 season of the Slovak First League (also known as 1. liga) is the seventeenth season of the league since its establishment. It began in late July 2009 and ended in May 2010.

Team changes from 2008–09
Promoted in Corgoň Liga: ↑Senica×↑
Relegated from Corgoň Liga: ↓Zlaté Moravce↓
Promoted in 1. liga: ↑Púchov↑, ↑Dolný Kubín↑, ↑Liptovský Mikuláš↑
Relegated from 1. liga: ↓Humenné↓, ↓Košice ↓, ↓Dunajská Streda ↓

× - Senica merged with Inter Bratislava

Stadia and locations

League table

Top goalscorers
Updated through games played on 29 May 2010; Source:

16 goals
 Karol Pavelka (FC ViOn Zlaté Moravce)

13 goals
 Peter Kuračka (FC ViOn Zlaté Moravce)

11 goals
 Patrik Čarnota (MFK Dolný Kubín)

9 goals
 Ruslan Lyubarskyi   (MFK Zemplín Michalovce)

8 goals
 Martin Luhový  (FK Púchov)

7 goals
 Dušan Sninský   (MFK Zemplín Michalovce)
 Jorge Salinas   (AS Trenčín)
 Filip Hlohovský   (AS Trenčín)

6 goals
 Peter Tomko   (MFK Tatran Liptovský Mikuláš)
 Ján Chovanec   (FK Púchov)
 Štefan Ondrička   (FK Púchov)
 David Depetris   (AS Trenčín)
 Fanendo Adi   (AS Trenčín)
 Róbert Szegedi   (FK LAFC Lučenec)
 Róbert Tomko   (FC ViOn Zlaté Moravce)

See also
2009–10 Slovak Superliga

References

External links
 Slovak FA official site 

2. Liga (Slovakia) seasons
2
Slovak